Fariš is a small village located in the corner of the Kavadarci Municipality in North Macedonia.

Demographics
According to the 2002 census, the village had a total of 23 inhabitants. Ethnic groups in the village include:

Macedonians 23

References 

Villages in Kavadarci Municipality